Beijing–Shijiazhuang high-speed railway is a 281-kilometre high-speed rail line operated by China Railway High-speed between Beijing and Shijiazhuang (the provincial capital of Hebei) that opened on 26 December 2012 after 4 years of construction. The total investment is 43.87 billion yuan.

References 

High-speed railway lines in China
Rail transport in Beijing
Rail transport in Hebei
Railway lines opened in 2012